Claude Vézina (born 15 June 1956) is a Canadian outlaw biker and gangster who served as president of the Rock Machine Motorcycle Club's Quebec City chapter, before being promoted to national president of the club after the imprisonment of Salvatore Cazzetta. He himself was also convicted of narcotics trafficking.

Criminal career
Nicknamed Ti-Loup (literally translated from French as "Little Wolf"), Vézina had already compiled a collection of convictions and arrests dating back to 1979 before he joined the Rock Machine, which had been established in 1986 to oppose the Hells Angels' monopolistic attitude towards the province of Quebec. He founded a chapter for the Rock Machine in Quebec City in the 1990s, and would remain as its acting president until 1994. Vézina was also a partial owner of the Rock Machine's clubhouse in Quebec which operated as a bar. That year, Rock Machine national president Salvatore Cazzetta was arrested at a pitbull farm located in Fort Erie, Ontario and charged with attempting to import more than eleven tons (22,000 lbs) of cocaine valued at an estimated 275 million dollars US (adjusting for inflation, the 2021 value is $513,238,697). Vézina succeeded Cazzetta as national president, and would lead the club through the initial period of the conflict with the Hells Angels. Renaud Jomphe was made president of the Montreal chapter, while Marcel Demers would replace Vézina as president of the Quebec City chapter, until eventually opening the Beauport chapter in late 1996.

Giovanni Cazzetta was released from prison in early 1997. He would return to the Rock Machine and was given the position of national president in his brother's absence, with Claude Vézina willingly vacating the post. In 1996, Marcel Demers who was acting president of the Quebec City chapter created a second Rock Machine chapter in the city, it was located in the suburb of Beauport. With Demers becoming the president of the new Beauport chapter, Frédéric Faucher was promoted to president of the Quebec City chapter. Giovanni would lead the club through the conflict until May 1997, when was subject to a police sting operation in which a man from Alberta attempted to purchase fifteen kilograms of cocaine. This individual turned out to be an informant for the Crown. The drug mules Frank Bonneville and Donald Waite, who delivered the cocaine to the informant, were arrested and the narcotics seized by police. Vézina would return to his role as National president for a short period.

Arrest and trial
On 21 May 1997, Vézina and his sergeant-at-arms Dany "Le Gros" Légaré were both charged with the trafficking of narcotics. In order to conduct his arrest, police had to sneak by guard dogs that he had located on his property; they entered his home and arrested him in his bedroom. This was all the result of a sting operation set up by the Quebec police. A police informant had completed seven transactions of narcotics with the two members of Rock Machine, during a five-month period. The massive raid launched by authorities as part of Operation Carcajou resulted in the seizure of a laboratory where narcotics such as PCP and methamphetamine were produced. $1,500,000 worth of various other narcotics, over 325 kg (716.5 lbs) of dynamite along with detonators, seven pistols, two fully automatic machine guns, three semi-automatic carbines and a pistol suppressor. After the arrest of Vézina, Frédéric Faucher became the Rock Machine's new national president on 11 September 1997, and Alain Burnette was promoted to president of the Quebec City chapter. Both Vézina and Légaré pled guilty in September 1997, and were sentenced to seven and five years' imprisonment respectively, to be served in the Donnacona maximum security detention center. On 14 October 1998, unknown assailants set fire to a business that was owned by Vézina; the fires caused several thousand dollars in damage.

Vézina and Légaré returned to court on 28 September 1999; both men pleaded guilty to thirteen charges, including living off the proceeds of crime. According to the prosecutor Brigitte Bishop, Vézina made over $400,000 per year, while only declaring an income of between $30,000 and $35,000. Vézina received four years, to be served alongside his narcotics trafficking conviction. He also received a $30,000 fine. Légaré would receive three years and a $20,000 fine. Among the items seized by the authorities in connection with this case was the Rock Machine's clubhouse belonging to the Point-Aux-Trembles
chapter, four motorcycles, three automobiles, jewellery, a chalet, and a sugar shack in Sainte-Brigitte-de-Laval.

Vézina quit the Rock Machine in February 2001. He contacted and told his club that he was quitting due to their decision to merge with the Texas-based Bandidos Motorcycle Club.

References

Further reading

 

1956 births
Living people
20th-century Canadian criminals
Canadian male criminals
Canadian gangsters
Canadian crime bosses
Canadian drug traffickers
Canadian prisoners and detainees
Prisoners and detainees of Canada
Canadian people convicted of drug offences
Rock Machine Motorcycle Club